Spyforce is an Australian television series that aired from 1971 to 1973 on Nine Network. The series was based upon the adventures of Australian Military Intelligence operatives in the South West Pacific during World War II. It was produced by Nine Network in conjunction with Paramount Pictures.

The series centres on the action and adventures of lead actor Jack Thompson's character Erskine, and his main support character, Peter Sumner's Gunthar Haber. It was the first lead role for Jack Thompson. The two are part of an elite unit of special operatives, the Special Intelligence Unit, and their adventures are loosely based upon those of the real Services Reconnaissance Department who often operated behind Japanese-held lines during the war.

Unlike most previous war films, Spyforce deliberately steered away from the notion that the United States was solely responsible for Japan's defeat, and highlights the important role Australian forces played in the defeat of the Imperial Japanese Army. Producer Roger Mirams was also careful to avoid stereotypes of the genre, and tired formulas for the battle scenes.

Synopsis
Spyforce was designed by Roger Mirams to be a wartime espionage action adventure in the format of a weekly, hour-long television mini-film. It was very much intended to highlight the important role played by Australian forces in achieving victory in World War II, but also remain exciting and compelling. Despite being based upon a war setting, character development played a key role in Spyforce. The way the main characters interact and change over time was carefully scripted by Mirams.

Unlike many previous war films, particularly American ones, Spyforce does not portray the protagonists as invincible, who always win an easy victory. Indeed, their human failings are made clear, and their plans do not always come to fruition. It does not dwell on torture by Japanese soldiers, or portray Australians as perfect.

The protagonists are members of a secretive special elite unit known as the Special Intelligence Unit, headed by Colonel Cato, who is only responsible directly to the Prime Minister of Australia. Cato's unit is responsible for sabotage and covert operations, often behind enemy lines, against Japanese forces in the South West Pacific during World War II.

Colonel Cato recruits both Erskine and Gunther Haber into the Special Intelligence Unit as civilian operatives due to their intimate knowledge of the South West Pacific and New Guinea. Both are reluctant at first, so Cato fabricates false evidence against them to coerce them into co-operating.

Although some episodes were filmed on location in New Guinea, Thailand, Hong Kong, Macau and also in Changi Prison in Singapore, most of the filming was done in the Australian bushland surrounding Sydney. Several ideal Sydney locations, such as Middle Head Fortifications were also used.

The narration during the opening credit sequence stated:
Early in 1942 the Japanese Army swept through the South Pacific towards the Australian mainland. They overran the Malay Peninsula and reached deep into the jungles of New Guinea. As a result numbers of civilian planters and soldiers were formed into highly trained espionage teams by Allied Headquarters in Australia. These men were directed into sabotage operations deep behind enemy lines throughout the Pacific area. Much of their work must remain top secret. One of these groups may well have been called: Spyforce.

Characters
 Erskine (played by Jack Thompson's character) is the hero and main protagonist of Spyforce. Erskine was an Australian planter in New Ireland in the Australian Territory of New Guinea when the Imperial Japanese Army invaded in 1942. Erskine is bitter about the Australian army withdrawing. Erskine is a heavy drinking, swearing, womanising and sometimes cold hearted man who has little time for rank or etiquette. He was forced off his plantation by advancing Japanese troops, and resents the Australian Army for not having properly protected his property. He is initially reluctant to help Spyforce and only does so because Cato promises to help track down the location of a girl Erskine loves, who is in a POW camp. Despite this, Erskine is an excellent soldier, although often prone to disobeying, or bending orders. He is quick to the trigger, and not afraid of tackling the Japanese head on if necessary. He also has a ruthless streak and can be cold and calculating at times. He despises Gunther Haber initially because they love the same girl, and resents being forced to work with him. But as the two men get to know each other, both realise they have a similar dishonest roguish character, and begin to bond.
 Gunther Haber (played by Peter Sumner) is Erskine's main sidekick. He is a German planter with a plantation on New Britain, and he too was forced to flee the advancing Japanese. Because of his German heritage, he is initially interned in a Prison Camp in Australia, but later is recruited by the Special Intelligence Unit for his linguistic skills and intimate knowledge of New Guinea. Haber is a cultured German, who is the complete foil for Erskine's rough and ready character. They are also love rivals, and initially the bitterness is strong between the two. However, as they begin to succeed together in their missions, a grudging mutual respect develops. At the beginning Erskine calls Haber 'Adolf' as a slight, but after the men begin to bond, he continues to use the nickname in a more friendly affectionate way.
 Colonel Cato (played by Redmond Phillips) is the Commanding Officer of the Special Intelligence Unit, and is only directly responsible to the Prime Minister of Australia. He is astutely intelligent, a clever strategist, very cunning and calculating, and is willing to do whatever is necessary to achieve his goals. Cato is not beyond bending the rules, and manipulates both Erskine and Haber into co-operating with the Special Intelligence Unit.
 Lieutenant French (played by actress Katy Wild) is Colonel Cato's secretary. Despite her cute good looks, she has her finger on the pulse of the operations. Although primarily limited to administrative duties in the Units headquarters office, French does occasionally operate in the field. Unlike Erskine and Haber, French is a member of the Australian Army, and holds the rank of Lieutenant. French has a crush on Erskine, and he an attracted admiration for her, but their relationship always remains platonic.
 Captain Pollock (played by Bill Hunter) was a primarily support role. He was an Australian Army captain who appeared in the first 11 episodes, primarily when the Special Intelligence Unit had to interact directly with the Australian Army.
 Captain Bergen (played by Stuart Finch) replaced Captain Pollock as the Australian Army's main officer in later episodes of Spyforce.
 Barrow (played by Max Cullen) was a psychopathic criminal that Colonel Cato used to use to brutally interrogate prisoners, due to his aggressive personality. Barrow only appears in the first and fourth episodes.
 Jill Stewart (played by Arna-Maria Winchester) is an ASIO undercover operative who is a master of disguise. She was born in Burma and has contacts throughout the South West Pacific and particularly in New Guinea. Stewart is a master linguist, fluent in five languages, and is also a firearms expert.

Production
Roger Mirams was a newsreel cameraman and war correspondent during World War II. He had long harboured an ambition to make a TV series set during the war. In 1959 he made a pilot called The Coastwatchers but no series resulted.

Mirams went on to establish a strong reputation in the world of children's TV. On one of the shows, Woobinda, Animal Doctor, he established a good working relationship with writer Ron McLean. Mirams showed McLean a concept he had been working on called Sparrowforce and McLean were enthusiastic.

The idea appealed to American producers Paramount Pictures, who backed Mirams to begin production without having seen a script. He made the pilot episode, "Spy Catcher", which was shot in November 1970.

The pilot impressed Paramount, who bought overseas distribution rights, and the Nine Network, who bought the local rights. The series was shot in colour even though Australian TV was broadcast in black and white at the time.

The first episode – retitled "The General" – aired in Sydney on 8 August 1971, and the rest of Australia on 26 August 1971. It was originally intended to produce 26 episodes, but following the success of the first series, Mirams held talks with both Nine Network and Paramount Pictures, who backed him for a second series. In all 42 episodes were produced. The series was last aired on Australian television in Adelaide on 21 September 1976, but has been re-run several times since.

Actor Russell Crowe appeared briefly in one episode as a child actor at the age of seven.

McLean wrote 35 of the episodes. The main directors were Howard Rubie and David Baker.

Episodes

Broadcast
The series continued to air in reruns through 21 September 1976.

Home media
Spyforce was released on DVD by Umbrella Entertainment in April 2013. The DVD set is compatible with all region codes.
On 09 November 2022 Umbrella Entertainment included a full episode of Spyforce (The Raiders) as a bonus feature for the Blu-ray double-feature release of Australian films Night of Fear and Inn of the Dammed, this was in celebration of Terry Bourke who was director of both films and that episode of Spyforce. The episode included an introduction by Jack Thompson recalling Bourke's direction.

References

External links

Spyforce at ClassicAustralianTV
Spyforce at Australian Television
Spyforce at National Film and Sound Archive
Spyforce at AustLit

Nine Network original programming
World War II television drama series
Australian drama television series
1971 Australian television series debuts
1976 Australian television series endings
Television series by CBS Studios